Magdalena of Sweden (Swedish: Magdalena Karlsdotter 1445 – August 1495) was a Swedish princess. She was the daughter of Charles VIII of Sweden and his first queen consort, Catherine of Bjurum. In 1468–1470, her spouse Ivar Axelsson (Tott) was the promised successor of her father as regent.

Biography
Magdalena was one of Charles's nine children, most of whom died in infancy. Her father became King of Sweden in 1448 and King of Norway in 1449. She married Ivar Axelsson (Tott) in Nyköping on 21 September 1466. Their marriage was childless. Her spouse was the uncle of Ingeborg Tott, the spouse of regent Sten Sture the Elder.

Her spouse was a former royal councillor in Denmark, having lived in Sweden since 1464, and after his marriage to Magdalena was made royal councillor of Sweden. In 1468, he was made more or less an informal co-regent and was promised to succeed his father-in-law after his death as interim regent, presiding over the council until the election of a new regent or monarch, and he was once described as "The most powerful man in Scandinavia". Upon the death of his father-in-law in 1470, however, he was not given enough support to become regent for Charles's young son, Magdalena's half-brother who soon was outmaneuvered anyway by Lord Sture. By 1472, it was clear that Magdalen's one-reign Bonde Dynasty would not survive on the throne, and her husband was given Stegeborg as a fief. Ivar Axelsson betrayed Sweden, admitting in 1476 that he was promised Gotland as a fief by the Danish King, and in 1481, an open conflict occurred between Ivar and Swedish Regent. Ivar was deemed as a traitor to Sweden, upon which Princess Magdalena, by order of Erik Oxenstierna at the council of Vadstena, was abducted and imprisoned. Magdalen became a widow in 1487.

Magdalena was the benefactor of the Grey Friar's Abbey on Riddarholmen in Stockholm, to which she made many large donations, by which she was honoured by the monks with the inscription Propentissima Benefactrix Ordinis Nostri. She died in Söderköping and was buried in the Grey Friar's Abbey there, of which few visible ruins remain.

References and literature
 
 Lars-Olof Larsson - Kalmarunionens tid
 Dick Harrison - Karl Knutsson
 http://runeberg.org/sqvinnor/0282.html
 Nordisk familjebok

1445 births
1495 deaths
15th-century Swedish people
Swedish princesses
Disinherited European royalty
15th-century Swedish women
Daughters of kings